Nate Trewyn (born May 16, 1996) is a former American football center. He attended Minnesota State University, Mankato, where he started all 12 regular season games in 2015. He then transferred to the University of Wisconsin-Whitewater. In 2018, Trewyn was named First-team All-American and won the Rimington Award for the top center in Division III. He participated at the pro day for Wisconsin. Trewyn signed with the Tampa Bay Buccaneers after going undrafted in the 2019 NFL Draft.

Professional career

Tampa Bay Buccaneers
Trewyn signed with the Tampa Bay Buccaneers as an undrafted free agent following the 2019 NFL Draft. On August 31, 2019, Trewyn was waived by the Buccaneers and was signed to the practice squad the next day. He was promoted to the active roster on October 12, 2019. He was waived on November 11.

Los Angeles Rams
On November 13, 2019, Trewyn was signed to the Los Angeles Rams practice squad. He signed a reserve/future contract with the Rams on December 31, 2019. He was waived on July 25, 2020.

References

External links
Wisconsin–Whitewater Warhawks bio

1996 births
Living people
American football centers
Los Angeles Rams players
Minnesota State Mavericks football players
Players of American football from Wisconsin
Sportspeople from Janesville, Wisconsin
Tampa Bay Buccaneers players
Wisconsin–Whitewater Warhawks football players

Minnesota State University, Mankato alumni